The open 4 × 2.5 kilometre relay competition of the 2022 Winter Paralympics was held at the National Biathlon Center in Beijing on 13 March 2022.

Results

See also
Cross-country skiing at the 2022 Winter Olympics

References

4 x 2.5 kilometre open relay